The large moth subfamily Lymantriinae contains the following genera beginning with P:

References 

Lymantriinae
Lymantriid genera P